Paula Tarvainen, née Huhtaniemi (born 17 February 1973) is a Finnish athlete who specializes in the javelin throw.

Tarvainen was born in Pori. Her personal best was 64.90 metres, achieved in August 2003 in Helsinki. It's the Finnish national record with the new javelin model.

Achievements

External links

1973 births
Living people
Sportspeople from Pori
Finnish female javelin throwers
Athletes (track and field) at the 2004 Summer Olympics
Olympic athletes of Finland